The 2021 VBA season was the sixth season of the Vietnam Basketball Association. The regular season began on 10 July but was canceled on 27 August due to a new surge of the COVID-19 pandemic in Vietnam.

The season was scheduled to start on 4 June, with the regular season and postseason set to be played in bubbles in Hanoi and Ho Chi Minh City. However, the start was postponed due to a surge of the Delta variant of COVID-19.

Teams
All seven teams from the 2020 season returned. The Vietnam national team was added as the eighth team to help prepare for the 2021 SEA Games.

Venues and locations
Due to the COVID-19 pandemic, all games were played in a bubble in Nha Trang on the campus of Nha Trang University.

Personnel and sponsorship

Regular season

Standings

Statistics

Individual statistic leaders

Team statistic leaders

References

External links
 Official website

Vietnam Basketball Association seasons
2021–22 in Vietnamese basketball
2021–22 in Asian basketball leagues
Vietnam